The geological History of Mount Hakone, has been researched by Dr. Hisashi Kuno et al., with Mount Hakone, located in Hakone, Kanagawa, Japan, as a volcano from the Quaternary period. 

From 50,000 years ago, new eruptions further created in the "Central volcanic cones" Mount Kami, the highest peak in Hakone, Mount Koma and other peaks; and about 300,000 years ago, the lava domes such as Mount Futago emerged.

Later about 3,000 years ago, the phreatic eruption on the northwest side of Mount Kami caused landslides, creating the Owakudani and, in the huge caldera, the Sengokuhara and Lake Ashi.

See also
Fuji-Hakone-Izu National Park
Kanagawa Prefectural Museum of Natural History

References

External link
Chronological diagram of Mount Hakone (Hakone, Kanagawa) (in Japanese)

Geography of Kanagawa Prefecture
Hakone, Kanagawa